Hattie is a feminine given name. 

Hattie may also refer to:

Hurricane Hattie, the strongest and deadliest tropical cyclone of the 1961 Atlantic hurricane season
Typhoon Hattie (Oyang), in the 1990 Pacific hurricane season
Hilo Hattie (1901-1979), Hawaiian singer, hula dancer, actress and comedian
John Hattie (born 1950), New Zealand education researcher and author
Hattie, Missouri, a ghost town
Hattie, West Virginia, an unincorporated community
Hattie Lake, Nova Scotia, Canada
Hattie Lakes, Nova Scotia, Canada
Hattie (film), a 2011 television film on the life of Hattie Jacques

See also
 Hatti (disambiguation)